NF2, NF-2, or similar, may refer to:

Transportation
 De Havilland Venom NF.2, a British post-war night fighter aircraft
 Nickel & Foucard NF-2 Asterix, a French homebuilt aircraft

Biology
 Neurofibromatosis type II, an inherited disease
 Merlin (protein) or Neurofibromin 2, a cytoskeletal protein
 Nitrogen difluoride a chemical radical with formula •NF2